What's Up Nurse! is a 1977 British sex comedy film directed by Derek Ford and starring Nicholas Field, Felicity Devonshire and John Le Mesurier. It tells the story of the adventures of a young doctor in a hospital. A sequel What's Up Superdoc! was released the following year, with Christopher Mitchell replacing Nicholas Field as Dr Todd.

Cast
John Le Mesurier as Dr. Ogden
Graham Stark as Carthew
Kate Williams as Matron
Angela Grant as Helen Arkwright
Nicholas Field as Dr. Robert 'Sweeney' Todd
Felicity Devonshire as Olivia Ogden
Jack Douglas as Constable
Barbara Mitchell as Neighbour
Peter Butterworth as Police Sergeant
Bill Pertwee as Flash Harry Harrison  
Cardew Robinson as Ticket Inspector
Chic Murray as Aquarium Proprietor  
Andrew Sachs as Guido the waiter
Anna Karen as Knitter  
Ronnie Brody as Jam Jar Man
Frank Williams as Vicar 
Julia Bond as Nurse
Elisabeth Day as 2nd Nurse
Sheila Bernette as Mrs. Garrard
Keith Smith as Mr. Newberry
Kate Harper as Club Girl  
Terry Duggan as Old Salt
Michael Cronin as Builder

Reception
Léon Hunt describes the film along with Ford's What's Up Superdoc! as a "return to the Carry On films' favourite setting to explore slap-and-tickle amidst the bedpans." Sarah Street
said that Ford's films Commuter Husbands (1972), Keep It Up, Jack (1973), The Sexplorer (1975) and What's Up Nurse (1977) were "films with salacious titles designed to titillate dwindling audiences with their suggestion of breaking taboos." Michael Hawkes awarded the film 3 out of 5 stars.

References

External links
 

British sex comedy films
1977 films
1970s sex comedy films
British sexploitation films
1977 comedy films
1970s English-language films
Films directed by Derek Ford
1970s British films